Migadops is a genus of ground beetles in the family Carabidae. There are at least two described species in Migadops.

Species
These two species belong to the genus Migadops:
 Migadops jeanneli Nègre, 1972  (Chile)
 Migadops latus (Guérin-Méneville, 1841)  (Argentina, Chile, and the Falkland Islands)

References

Migadopinae